Countess Walewska is a 1914 Polish historical film directed by Aleksander Hertz and starring Stefan Jaracz, Maria Dulęba and Bronisław Oranowski. The film was made as a co-production with the French company Pathé Frères. It portrays the life of Maria Walewska the Polish-born mistress of the French Emperor Napoleon.

Cast
 Stefan Jaracz as Napoleon Bonaparte
 Maria Dulęba as Maria Walewska 
 Bronisław Oranowski as Duke Józef Poniatowski

References

Bibliography
 Liehm, Mira & Liehm, Antonín J. The Most Important Art: Eastern European Film After 1945. University of California Press, 1977.

External links 
 

1914 films
1910s historical films
Polish historical films
Polish silent films
Films directed by Aleksander Hertz
Films set in France
Films set in the 1800s
Films set in the 1810s
Depictions of Napoleon on film
Polish black-and-white films